Claudio Undari (12 January 1935 – 12 May 2008), known professionally as Robert Hundar, was an Italian film actor and stage actor, best known for his roles of "Bad Guy" in Spaghetti Western and "Poliziottesco" movies. He starred in about 40 movies between 1960 and 1980.

Born in Castelvetrano, Trapani and spent his youth in Catania. He debuted in 1956 and he then moved to Madrid to keep up his busy career. The first real star of Spaghetti western,  as to be called "The King of Spaghetti westerns", Undari was forced to return to Italy when the glorious days of the spaghetti genre began to decline.

Selected filmography 

 Roland the Mighty (1956) - Balicante
 Goliath and the Dragon (1960) - Polimorfeo
 Run with the Devil (1960) - Kristic
 The Joy of Living (1961) - Fascist
 Il segno del vendicatore (1962)
 Lo sparviero dei Caraibi (1962) - Don Pedro de Alicante 
 Marco Polo (1962) - Mongka 
 L'ombra di Zorro (1962) - Billy
 Tres hombres buenos (1963) - Niño McCoy 
 Una sporca faccenda (1964) - Giocatore d'azzardo
 The Terror of Rome Against the Son of Hercules (1964) - Zefatius
 El sabor de la venganza (1964) - Chet Walker
 Ride and Kill (1964) - Moody 
 The Seven from Texas (1964) - Ringo
 Cavalca e uccidi (1964) - Moody
 Jesse James' Kid (1965) - Bill James 
 The Relentless Four (1965) - Alan
 100.000 dollari per Lassiter (1966) - Lassiter
 Ramon the Mexican (1966) - Ramon Morales
 Un hombre y un Colt (1967) - Dakota Joe 
 Death Rides Along (1967) - Luke Prentiss
 A Hole in the Forehead (1968) - General Munguya
 Il suo nome gridava vendetta (1968) - Clay Hackett
 A Hole in the Forehead (1968)
 Emma Hamilton (1968) - Le capitaine Hardy 
 Battle of the Commandos (1969) - Pvt. Raymond Stone
 Sabata (1969) - Oswald, Stengel Henchman 
 The Weekend Murders (1970) - Arthur, the valet 
 Cut-Throats Nine (1972) - Sgt. Brown
 Mean Frank and Crazy Tony (1973) - Assassin
 The Fighting Fist of Shanghai Joe (1973) - Pedro, The Cannibal 
 La padrina (1973)
 Dallas (1974) - Doug Bright 
 Giubbe rosse (1975) - Wolf Seattle
 White Fang and the Gold Diggers (1975) - Barney Taft 
 White Fang and the Hunter (1975) - Ferguson
 Free Hand for a Tough Cop (1976) - Mario
 The Cynic, the Rat and the Fist (1977) - Dario
 La bella e la bestia (1977) - The Tsar (segment "La schiava")
 California (1977) - Eric Plummer
 Star Odyssey (1979) - Galactic Auctioner 
 Beast in Space (1980) - Onaf
 Everything Happens to Me (1980) - Alien Boss 
 Animali metropolitani (1987) - Il Marchese (uncredited)
 Onorevoli detenuti (1998)
 Libero Burro (1999) - Tito
 Ponte Milvio (2000)
 The Knights of the Quest (2001)
 Three Days of Anarchy (2005)

References

External links 
 

Italian male film actors
1935 births
2008 deaths
Actors from Sicily
Male Spaghetti Western actors
People from Castelvetrano